"Cried All the Way Home" is a song recorded by Canadian country music artist Jamie Warren. It was released in 1998 as the first single from his second studio album, Just Not the Same. It peaked at number 7 on the RPM Country Tracks chart in July 1998.

Chart performance

Year-end charts

References

1998 songs
1998 singles
Jamie Warren songs